Great Silence may refer to:

The Great Silence observed by some Christian monks and nuns after Compline.
Into Great Silence, a 2005 documentary film by Philip Gröning, named for the above.
The Fermi paradox (astronomy); also referred to as the silencium universi or silentium universi
The Great Silence, a film/western by Sergio Corbucci